Garrya elliptica, the coast silk-tassel, silk tassel bush or wavyleaf silktassel, is a species of flowering plant in the family Garryaceae, native to the coastal ranges of California and southern Oregon.

Description

Growth habit
It has a multi-furcate branching structure yielding an almost spherical form.  The height averages  in the wild. Like others of its genus, G. elliptica has opposite leaves with a tough leathery feel, glossy green on top, but paler and duller on the underside.

Flowers
Although the flowers bloom in late winter and early spring, dried bracts remain on the plant well into summer as light gray decorations. The plant has smooth bark, dark-greenish when young, but roughening with age. New twigs are green and moderately stout.

For pistillate flowers, above each small bract there is a solitary flower inside the inflorescence.  This plant produces tiny dark seeds.
The ripened purplish black fruit of about 1 cm in diameter has a hard desiccated coating, but is rather fleshy on the interior. There are a total of  four stamens per flower; moreover, above each bract pair there is a triplet of flowers.

Leaves

The unique characteristics of Garrya elliptica are its waxy convex leaves with wavy leaf margins, coupled with dense individual hairs on the leaf undersides that are scarcely distinguishable with a hand lens. For identification purposes Congdon silk-tassel (Garrya congdonii) is most closely related. Congdon silk-tassel has the same leaf appearance, but leaf hairs are distinguishable with a hand lens, and both leaf blades and petioles are about two thirds the size of Coast silk-tassel. Both Fremont silk-tassel (Garrya fremontii) and ashy silk-tassel (Garrya flavescens) have similar fruit characteristics, but have a flat leaf margin.

Distribution and habitat
Garrya elliptica is found in several plant communities, principally in drier coastal California and southern Oregon no more than 20 miles from the Pacific Ocean; the main associations are coastal sage and chaparral ecoregion, Northern coastal scrub, Mixed evergreen coastal forest and Northern coastal sage scrub.<ref>Roxana S. Ferris, Native shrubs of the San Francisco Bay region, University of California Press, (1968) </ref>  This plant can tolerate moderately heavy clay soils and serpentine areas, but likes soils pH to lie in the range of six to eight.

The species is usually found at elevations above , within the mountains of the Pacific Coast range, such as Montara Mountain, San Bruno Mountain and Napa County.

CultivationGarrya elliptica is appealing as an ornamental plant with a neat growing habit, and is widely used for landscape purposes. It is a low-maintenance plant that thrives in a range of locations, but is typically seen growing against a wall, or as a windbreak in coastal areas. The cultivar 'James Roof' has gained the Royal Horticultural Society’s Award of Garden Merit.

EtymologyGarrya is named for Nicholas Garry, who was secretary of the Hudson's Bay Company [circa 1820-35]. Elliptica'' is derived from Greek and means 'about twice as long as broad', 'oblong with rounded ends', or 'elliptic'; this is in reference to the shape of the leaves.

References

External links

Calflora Database: Garrya elliptica (Coast silktassel)
Jepson Manual: 
Coast silk-tassel with reference to gardening
Virginia Tech Forestry Department
Oregonstate.edu: detailed botanical description
Garrya elliptica — U.C. Photo gallery

Garryales
Flora of California
Flora of Oregon
Flora of the Klamath Mountains
Flora of the Sierra Nevada (United States)
Natural history of the California chaparral and woodlands
Natural history of the California Coast Ranges
Natural history of the San Francisco Bay Area
Garden plants of North America
Drought-tolerant plants
Flora without expected TNC conservation status